Crystal Eyes is a Swedish power metal band formed in 1992. Singer, guitarist and songwriter Mikael Dahl is the only constant member in their line-up. It was announced in 2009 that vocalist Søren Nico Adamsen would be leaving the band and that Mikael Dahl would be resuming vocal duties. In 2012, guitarist Paul Petterson left the band and was replaced by former guitarist Nicolas Karlsson. On 11 May 2012 the band celebrated its 20th anniversary with a special concert featuring songs from all of their albums.

Discography 
 World of Black and Silver (1999)
 In Silence They March (2000)
 Vengeance Descending (2003)
 Confessions of the Maker (2005)
 Dead City Dreaming (2006)
 Chained (2008)
 Killer (2014)
 Starbourne Traveler (2019)

Line-up 
Mikael Dahl – Vocals, Guitar
Niclas Karlsson – Guitar
Claes Wikander – Bass
Stefan Svantesson – Drums

Timeline

Former members

Vocals 
Søren Nico Adamsen (2006–2009)

Guitar 
Paul Petterson  (2006–2012)
Jukka Kaupaamaa (1995–1997)
Jonathan Nyberg (1997–2006)

Bass 
Christian Gunnarsson (1992–1993)
Mikael Blohm (1993–1995)
Kim Koivo (1995–1996)
Marko Nicolaidis (1996–1997)

Drums 
Fredrik Gröndahl (1993–1994)
Martin Tilander (1994–1995)
Kujtim Gashi (1995–2001)

Session vocals 
Daniel Heiman (2005)

External links 
 Official website
 Official MySpace
 Metal-archives.com

Swedish power metal musical groups
Musical groups established in 1992